Shadows of Arkham is a Bolliger & Mabillard steel roller coaster at Parque Warner Madrid in Spain. It is located in the "DC Super Heroes World" location in the park. It is a clone of Batman: The Ride, which is located at various Six Flags parks. It can be ridden with virtual reality glasses, making it the first virtual reality coaster in Spain. Before the addition of the VR technology its name was Batman: La Fuga ("Batman: The Escape")

History
The ride is 1:15 seconds long, and opened on 6 April 2002 along with Parque Warner Madrid. The color scheme of the ride is yellow and blue.

Layout

Roller coasters in Spain
Roller coasters introduced in 2002
Batman in amusement parks
2002 establishments in Spain
Warner Bros. Global Brands and Experiences attractions
Inverted roller coasters manufactured by Bolliger & Mabillard